The 2003 Fórmula Truck season was the 8th Fórmula Truck season. It began on March 16 at Goiânia and ended on December 7 at Curitiba.

Calendar and results
All races were held in Brazil.

References

External links
  

2003 in Brazilian motorsport
2003